Magkasangga sa Batas (International title: Lethal Panther 2 or Lethal Panther 2: Partners In Law) is a 1993 Philippine-Hong Kong action film directed by Phillip Ko and Erwin Lanado. The film stars Cynthia Luster, Stella Mari and Edu Manzano. Although it is a sequel to the 1990 movie Lethal Panther, their plots are not related to each other.

Plot
NBI agent Albert Moran is on the lookout for the group behind blackmailing him. With the help of his fellow agents and outside forces within Interpol, Moran goes through adversities that only motivated him to pursue justice.

Cast
 Cynthia Luster as Jane Matsuko
 Stella Mari as Sharon
 Edu Manzano as Albert Moran
 Monsour del Rosario as Nestor
 Sheila Ysrael as Cindy
 Charlie Davao as Maj. Foronda
 Lovely Rivero as Wife of Albert
 Johnny Wilson as Mr. Castelo
 Marita Zobel as Albert's Mother
 Lani Lobangco as Nestor's Wife
 Paolo Contis as Boyet
 Gabriel Romulo as Yakuza
 Rachel Lobangco as Yakuza
 King Gutierrez as Yakuza
 Edwin Reyes as Yakuza
 Boy Fernandez as Yakuza
 Telly Babasa as Yakuza
 Naty Santiago as Yakuza
 Louie Katana as Yakuza

Production
The film had a working title Kapag ang Batas Kinalaban and internationally Target: Albert Moran.

References

External links

1993 films
Filipino-language films
1990s English-language films
1990s Cantonese-language films
Hong Kong action films
Philippine action films
Philippine multilingual films
Hong Kong multilingual films
1993 action films
Harvest International Films films
1990s Hong Kong films